Baptists Together (officially The Baptist Union of Great Britain) is a Baptist Christian denomination in England and Wales. It is affiliated with the Baptist World Alliance and Churches Together in England. The headquarters is in Didcot.

History
The Baptist Union was founded by 45 Particular Baptist churches in 1813 in London. In 1832, it was reorganized to include the New Connection General Baptist Association (General Baptist churches) as a partner.  In 1891, the two associations merged to form a single organization. General Baptists and Particular Baptists work was united in the Baptist Union in 1891. The Baptist Historical Society was founded in 1908.

In 2013 Lynn Green was elected, with no votes against, as the first female General Secretary of the Baptist Union of Great Britain to commence in September 2013.  She was received at the vote by a standing ovation and her inaugural message included "I believe that our union is ready for generational change...  It is time to cast off the institutional mindset that has served us well in the past, and embrace a new way of being for the 21st century."

Also in 2013, the union publicly re-branded itself as "Baptists Together" and introduced a new logo to reflect the change (although it is still known in an official capacity by its former name, the Baptist Union of Great Britain).

Membership
According to a denomination census released in 2020, it claimed 1,895 churches and 111,208 members.

Missionary organization
The Fellowship of British Baptists and BMS World Mission brings together in ministry the churches that are members of the Baptist Union of Scotland, Wales, the Irish Baptist Networks, and the Baptist Union of Great Britain. It is itself a member of The National Council for Voluntary Youth Services (NCVYS) because of its work to promote young people's personal and social development.

Inter-denominational associations
The union maintains membership with Christian ecumenical organisations such as Churches Together in England, Churches Together in Britain and Ireland, the Conference of European Churches, and the World Council of Churches.

Missionary Society
The Particular Baptist Missionary Society for Propagating the Gospel among the Heathen (later the Baptist Missionary Society, and now BMS World Mission) was organised in 1792, under the leadership of Andrew Fuller (1754–1815), John Sutcliff (1752–1814), and William Carey (1761–1834).

Beliefs
The union has a Baptist confession of faith. It is a member of the Baptist World Alliance.

Schools 
The union is a partner of five Baptist Colleges including South Wales Baptist College, Regent's Park College, Northern Baptist College, Bristol Baptist College, Spurgeon's College.

Structure
Since 2001 the Baptist Union of Great Britain has been divided into 13 regional associations:
Central Baptist Association
East Midlands Baptist Association
Eastern Baptist Association
Heart of England Baptist Association
London Baptist Association
North Western Baptist Association
Northern Baptist Association
South Eastern Baptist Association
South Wales Baptist Association
South West Baptist Association
Southern Counties Baptist Association
West of England Baptist Association
Yorkshire Baptist Association

Leadership 
The principal of the Union is the General Secretary.

List of Presidents

List of General Secretaries 
 1898 – 1924 John Howard Shakespeare
 1925 – 1951 Melbourn Aubrey
 1951 – 1967 Ernest A. Payne
 1967 – 1982 David S. Russell
 1982 – 1991 Bernard Green
 1991 – 2006 David Coffey
 2006 – 2013 Jonathan Edwards
 2013 – Lynn Green

Doctrinal controversies 

At the Baptist Union Assembly in April 1971, Michael Taylor, then Principal at the Northern Baptist College, asserted, "I believe that God was active in Jesus, but it will not do to say quite categorically: Jesus is God." The statement bred controversy, and some charged him with denying the Deity of Christ. Nigel G. Wright, later Principal of Spurgeon's College, commenting on the affair, claimed the, "Spectre of theological downgrade had lingered within the denomination throughout the 20th century," alluding to the Downgrade Controversy of a century earlier.

See also
Baptist Union of Scotland
Religion in the United Kingdom
Regent's Park College, Oxford
Baptist churches in the United Kingdom
Spurgeon and the "Downgrade Controversy"
 Baptist beliefs
 Worship service (evangelicalism)
 Jesus Christ
 Believers' Church

Notes

References

Bibliography
 .
 .
 .
 .
 .

External links
Baptist Historical Society – official Web Site
Baptist Union of Great Britain – official Web Site
The Baptist Times – Web Site of the official newspaper of the BUGB
Incarnate Network – Web Site of the church planting network of BUGB Missions Dept
The National Council for Voluntary Youth Services (NCVYS) – England-wide organisation of which the Baptist Union is a member

 
Baptist denominations in the United Kingdom
Christianity in Oxfordshire
Members of the World Council of Churches
1813 establishments in the United Kingdom
Organisations based in Oxfordshire
Protestantism in the United Kingdom
Religious organizations established in 1813
South Oxfordshire District